The Steele Community Centre, previously named the Gander Community Centre, is a multi-purpose venue located on Airport Boulevard in Gander, Newfoundland and Labrador. The community centre, owned and operated by the Town of Gander, is used to host trade shows, conferences, sporting events and special events. It is home to the Gander Flyers of the Central West Senior Hockey League.

Construction 
The final construction cost of the GCC was just over $6 million. There is seating for 1100 spectators, a  walking track and an  × 200 ft regulation-size ice surface.

The community centre was officially opened on May 5, 2000.

Notable events
Canadian National National Darts Championships in June 2000.
Pre-Olympic Ladies Canadian National team vs Russia in 2001.
2010 Female Midget Atlantic Championships.

September 11, 2001

When American air space was closed after the terrorist attacks on September 11, 2001, 38 passenger planes with over 6,500 passengers and crew were diverted to the Gander Airport. The people of Gander and surrounding communities donated large amounts of food and other supplies for the unexpected visitors. The Gander Community Centre became a giant "walk-in fridge" for the food donations.

References

External links 
 Gander Community Centre on the Town of Gander's website

Ice hockey venues in Newfoundland and Labrador
Sports venues in Newfoundland and Labrador
Indoor ice hockey venues in Canada
Indoor arenas in Newfoundland and Labrador
Ice hockey in Newfoundland and Labrador
Gander, Newfoundland and Labrador